María Dolores "Lola" Gallardo Núñez (born 10 June 1993) is a Spanish professional footballer who plays as a goalkeeper for Primera División club Atlético Madrid and the Spain women's national team.

Club career
Lola started her career at Sevilla FC before moving to Sporting Huelva. and arriving at Atlético Madrid in 2012.

International career
In 2010, she was named the best player in the U-17 European Championship and the best goalkeeper in the U-17 World Cup.

In June 2013 national team coach Ignacio Quereda selected Gallardo in the senior Spain squad for UEFA Women's Euro 2013 in Sweden, one of two reserves for established first choice goalkeeper Ainhoa Tirapu. Gallardo had won her first senior international cap in a 2–2 pre-tournament friendly draw with Denmark in Vejle.

She was part of Spain's squad at the 2015 and 2019 FIFA Women's World Cups, as well as the UEFA Women's Euro 2017.

Honours

Club
 Atlético Madrid
 Primera División: 2016–17, 2017–18, 2018–19
 Copa de la Reina de Fútbol: 2016

Olympique Lyon
 UEFA Women's Champions League: 2019–20

International
 Spain
 UEFA Women's Under-17 Championship (1): 2010

Individual
 UEFA Women's Under-17 Championship Golden Player Award: 2010

Personal life
Gallardo is in a relationship with her former Atlético Madrid teammate Carmen Menayo.

References

External links
 
 
 

1993 births
Living people
Footballers from Seville
Spanish women's footballers
Spain women's international footballers
Primera División (women) players
Sporting de Huelva players
Atlético Madrid Femenino players
2015 FIFA Women's World Cup players
Women's association football goalkeepers
2019 FIFA Women's World Cup players
Lesbian sportswomen
LGBT association football players
Spanish LGBT sportspeople
UEFA Women's Euro 2022 players
UEFA Women's Euro 2017 players
Spain women's youth international footballers
21st-century Spanish women